India Calling is an Indian television series  that aired on Star One from  14 November 2005 to 5 October 2006.

Plot 
Chandni is the middle class girl living in Jalandhar who adores her elder sister, Mini Didi / Manisha Kapoor. Manisha is working in Mumbai as a call centre executive. Due to Manisha's absence on her engagement, Chandni gets engaged with Dilawar. But before marriage, she decides to go to Mumbai, to experience the famed city life, and meet her Mini Didi. But, being unable to find Manisha, she decides to take up the job at the call center, India calling, in her sister's search. Meanwhile after an initial hate relationship, she fall in love with Aditya, the owner of the call center.  She is unaccustomed to the nonstop pace of city life. The show follows Chandni's struggles in life while working in a call center and trying to find her sister, Mini Didi / Manisha Kapoor.

Cast 
 Manasi Parekh as Chandni Kapoor 
 Rajsingh Verma as Boss
 Keerti Gaekwad Kelkar as Manisha Kapoor / Mini Didi
 Vipul Gupta as Aditya Khanna 
 Nigaar Khan as Kamini Khanna
 Anang Desai as Mr. Kapoor 
 Himani Shivpuri as Lajoji
 Rushad Rana as Dilawar
 Karishma Randhawa as Tara Vadhera
 Ayub Khan as Mr. Khanna (Kamini's husband and Aditya's elder brother)
 Gulfam Khan as Sunita
 Kanika Maheshwari as Ami
 Pankit Thakker
 Ashish Kapoor

Music composer 
Abhijeet Hegdepatil

References

Star One (Indian TV channel) original programming
2005 Indian television series debuts
2006 Indian television series endings
Rose Audio Visuals